The Golden Horse Award for Best New Performer is given at the Golden Horse Film Awards since 2000.

Winners and nominees

2000s

2010s

2020s

References

External links 
  

Golden Horse Film Awards
Film awards for male debut actors
Film awards for debut actress
Awards established in 2000
2000 establishments in Taiwan